The Catenulisporales are an order of bacteria.

References 

Actinomycetia
Bacteria orders